The Serbian basketball league system, or Serbian basketball league pyramid is a series of interconnected competitions for professional basketball clubs in Serbia. The system has a hierarchical format with a promotion and demotion system between competitions at different levels.

Men
There are currently five different competitions on the pyramid - the 1st tier Basketball League of Serbia, the 2nd tier Second Basketball League of Serbia, the 3rd tier First Regional League, the 4th tier Second Regional League, which comprises the lower level regional divisions.

Basketball League of Serbia and Basketball League of Serbia B are organized by the Basketball Federation of Serbia while the lower tiers are organized by the Regional Federations.

The tier levels
For the 2018–19 season, the Serbian basketball league system is as follows:

Level 5 – Local Summer Leagues

Other competitions
Radivoj Korać Cup (1st tier)
Basketball Cup of Serbia (2nd tier)

Women
Since the 2006–07 season, there are currently different competitions on the pyramid.

 First Women's Basketball League of Serbia, organized by the Basketball Federation of Serbia and composed of 10 teams.
 Second Women's Basketball League of Serbia, organized by the Basketball Federation of Serbia and composed of 10 teams.
 First Women's Regional Basketball League

Other competitions
Milan Ciga Vasojević Cup

See also
League system
European professional club basketball system
Spanish basketball league system
Greek basketball league system
Italian basketball league system
French basketball league system
Russian basketball league system
Turkish basketball league system
German basketball league system
Polish basketball league system
Hungarian basketball league system
South American professional club basketball system

References

External links
Basketball League of Serbia Official Website 
Serbian Basketball Federation 
Competitions in Serbia 

 
Basketball league systems